Thad Jones/Mel Lewis and Manuel De Sica and the Jazz Orchestra is a big band jazz recording by the Thad Jones/Mel Lewis Orchestra recorded in Europe in 1973 and 1974.

Track listing
 "First Jazz Suite" (De Sica)
 "Brasserie" – 3:19
 "Father" – 4:03
 "Sing" – 5:22
 "Ballade" – 3:09
 "For Life" – 5:54
 "Little Pixie" (Jones) – 12:19

Personnel
 Manuel De Sica - composer
 Thad Jones – flugelhorn
 Mel Lewis – drums
 Roland Hanna – piano
 George Mraz – bass
 Jerry Dodgion – alto saxophone, flute
 Eddie Xiques – alto saxophone, clarinet
 Billy Harper – tenor saxophone
 Ron Bridgewater – tenor saxophone, clarinet
 Pepper Adams – baritone saxophone
 Jon Faddis – trumpet
 Jim Bossy – trumpet
 Steve Furtado – trumpet
 Cecil Bridgewater – trumpet
 Jimmy Knepper – trombone
 Quentin Jackson – trombone
 Billy Campbell – trombone
 Cliff Heather – trombone
 Dee Dee Bridgewater – vocals

References / External links

 Allmusic [ link]
 tagtuner.com
 PAUSA Records PR-7012
 Manuel De Sica web site

The Thad Jones/Mel Lewis Orchestra albums
1974 albums